Borgo a Buggiano is a town in Tuscany, central Italy, and the municipal seat of the comune of Buggiano, province of Pistoia.

Borgo a Buggiano is about 21 km from Pistoia and 53 km from Florence.

Sports
The town is home to the football team U.S. Borgo a Buggiano 1920.

References

Bibliography

External links
 

Frazioni of the Province of Pistoia